Team Zagreb was a Croatian hockey team. It was founded in 2010, with the aim to concentrate the best hockey players in Zagreb into one team. The club replaced KHL Mladost and KHL Medveščak in the 2010–11 Slohokej League season.

References

Ice hockey clubs established in 2010
Ice hockey teams in Croatia
Slohokej League teams